Gracilimiris is a genus of plant bugs in the family Miridae. There are at least three described species in Gracilimiris.

Species
These three species belong to the genus Gracilimiris:
 Gracilimiris litoralis Stonedahl & Henry, 1991
 Gracilimiris strigosus Stonedahl & Henry, 1991
 Gracilimiris wheeleri Stonedahl & Henry, 1991

References

Further reading

 
 
 
 

Miridae genera
Articles created by Qbugbot
Mirini